"The Beautiful Briny" is a song written by Robert and Richard Sherman, originally for the Walt Disney film Mary Poppins, but eventually used instead in the 1971 musical film production Bedknobs and Broomsticks.  David Tomlinson (Mr. Emelius Browne) and Angela Lansbury (Miss Eglantine Price) perform the song as a duet under the water, in the lagoon of the Island of Naboombu.

Thematic Placement
With a moment to garner perspective "far from the frenzy of the frantic world above", Browne and Price dance to the music of a 1940s night club orchestra.  The orchestra is made up of sea creatures.  At one point in the song, possible romance is alluded to, but it is not specified as in addition to Miss Price and Mr. Browne, pairs of male and female animated sea creatures such as electric eels and lobsters are shown dancing in the song.

Other Film Connections
"Under the Sea" from the 1989 musical film The Little Mermaid (and which won the Oscar for "Best Original Song" that year) was thematically inspired by "Beautiful Briny" as both songs are, more or less, about the same thing.

Literary Sources
 Sherman, Robert B. Walt's Time: from before to beyond. Santa Clarita: Camphor Tree Publishers, 1998.

References

1971 songs
Songs from Bedknobs and Broomsticks
Male–female vocal duets
Songs about fish
Songs about oceans and seas
Songs written by the Sherman Brothers